Cyrtopodion potoharense, also known commonly as the Potahar gecko or the Potwar gecko, is a species of lizard in the family Gekkonidae. The species is endemic to northern Pakistan.

Geographic range
C. potoharense is found in Rawalpindi District, Punjab Province, Pakistan.

Habitat
The natural habitat of C. potoharense is mud flats.

Reproduction
C. potoharense is oviparous.

References

Further reading
Khan MS (2001). "Taxonomic notes on angular-toed Gekkota of Pakistan, with description of a new species of genus Cyrtopodion ". Pakistan Journal of Zoology 31 (1): 13-24. (Cyrtopodion potoharensis, new species).

Cyrtopodion
Reptiles described in 2001
Reptiles of Pakistan